Kouto Department is a department of Bagoué Region in Savanes District, Ivory Coast. In 2021, its population was 175,587 and its seat is the settlement of Kouto. The sub-prefectures of the department are Blességué, Gbon, Kolia, Kouto, and Sianhala.

History
Kouto Department was created in 2008 as a second-level subdivision via a split-off from Boundiali Department. At its creation, it was part of Savanes Region.

In 2011, districts were introduced as new first-level subdivisions of Ivory Coast. At the same time, regions were reorganised and became second-level subdivisions and all departments were converted into third-level subdivisions. At this time, Kouto Department became part of Bagoué Region in Savanes District.

Notes

Departments of Bagoué
2008 establishments in Ivory Coast
States and territories established in 2008